Paul Stanley (born 22 August 1983) is a British short track speed skater. He competed in two events at the 2006 Winter Olympics.

References

External links
 
Paul Stanley at ISU

1983 births
Living people
British male short track speed skaters
Olympic short track speed skaters of Great Britain
Short track speed skaters at the 2006 Winter Olympics
Sportspeople from Solihull